Mansa Assembly constituency is one of the 117 Legislative Assembly constituencies of Punjab state in India.
It is part of Mansa district.

Members of the Legislative Assembly

Election results

2022

2017

2012

2007

2002

1997

1992

See also
 List of constituencies of the Punjab Legislative Assembly
 Mansa district, India

References

External links
  

Assembly constituencies of Punjab, India
Mansa district, India